Joice

 Joice (name)
 Kia Joice, a MPV made by Korean automaker KIA Motors
 Joice, Iowa

See also
 Joyce (disambiguation)